Hassan "Doctor" Zee is a Pakistani-American film director who was born in Chakwal, Pakistan.

Early life
Doctor Zee grew up in Chakwal, a small village in Punjab, Pakistan. as one of seven brothers and sisters  His father was in the military and this fact required the family to move often to different cities. As a child Zee was forbidden from watching cinema because his father believed movies were a bad influence on children.

At age 13, Doctor Zee got his start in the world of entertainment at Radio Pakistan where he wrote and produced radio dramas and musical programs.  It was then that he realized his passion for storytelling 

At the age of 26, Doctor Zee earned his medical doctorate degree and did his residency in a burn unit at the Pakistan Institute of Medical Sciences. He cared for women who were victims of  "Bride Burning," the archaic practice used as a form of punishment against women who fail to provide sufficient dowry to their in-laws after marriage or fail to provide offspring.  He also witnessed how his country’s transgender and intersex people, called “hijras”, were banned from having jobs and forced to beg to survive. These experiences inspired Doctor Zee to tackle the issues of women’s empowerment and gender inequality in his films.

In 1999, he came to San Francisco to pursue his dream of filmmaking and made San Francisco his home

Education
He received his early education from Jinnah Public School, Chakwal. He got his medical doctor degree at Rawalpindi Medical College, Pakistan.

Film career
Doctor Zee's first film titled Night of Henna was released in 2005. The theme of the film dealt with "the conflict between Old World immigrant customs and modern Western ways..." Night of Henna focused on the problems of Pakistani expatriates who found it hard to adjust in American culture. Many often landed themselves in trouble when it came to marrying off their children.
His second film Bicycle Bride came out in 2010, which was about "the clash between the bonds of family and the weight of tradition." His third film House of Temptation that came out in 2014 was about a family which struggles against the temptations of the Devil. His fourth film “Good Morning Pakistan”, concerned a young American’s journey back to Pakistan where he confronts the contradictory nature of a beautiful and ancient culture that's marred by economic, educational and gender inequality 

His upcoming fifth film, "Ghost in San Francisco" is a supernatural thriller starring Felissa Rose, Dave Sheridan, and Kyle Lowder where a soldier comes home from Afghanistan to discover that his wife is having an affair with his best friend. While battling with his inner ghosts and demons, he meets a mysterious woman in San Francisco who promises him a ritual for his cure.

References 

Living people
American film directors
American people of Pakistani descent
Year of birth missing (living people)